Cigarette advertising in Indonesia is presently allowed, and as of 2021, Indonesia is the only country in the world to allow cigarette advertising. However, it is prohibited to show cigarettes and advertising must include smoking warning messages. In Indonesia itself, such advertisements known under the name  in Indonesian. In 2003, cigarette advertising and promotions in Indonesia was valued at $250 million. In addition to television and outdoor advertisements, sporting events sponsored by cigarette brands or companies also occur.

According to the mayor of Bogor, Bima Arya Sugiarto, smoking attempts among children and teens under 18 years are mostly caused by seeing cigarette advertisements and promotions.

Regulation 

It has been replaced ever since with image of a laryngeal cancer survivor underwent laryngectomy, due to presumed contradictive effect for promoting smoking. Currently, it says:  with quitline number included.

Cigarette advertisements are also prohibited from showing children, pregnant women, cartoon characters, cigarette recommendations or misleading words. The sizes of billboards are not allowed to be more than 72 square meters in area. Advertisements of promotion strategies of cigarette companies are classified as "cigarette advertisements". In addition, cigarette advertisements must include a warning message shown on the cigarette package, per Indonesian Government Regulation number 109 of 2012. Such warning messages are shown at bottom position (also in the case of outdoor advertisements even before 2013), or after the advertisement until the end of 2013.

Such cigarette advertisements are only allowed to air on television channels from 21:30 until 05:00 local time. However, national, Jakarta-based television networks almost always stop airing cigarette advertisements after 03:00 a.m., probably due to its closer time to 05:00 a.m. in eastern Indonesia.

Contents 

Early Indonesian cigarette advertisements used to display the cigarette packaging and cigarettes before being prohibited. Currently, advertisements mostly feature motivational messages, social criticisms, and sometimes adventure (as in Djarum Super) as well as animation.

Examples 
A Mild advertisements, known by one of their slogans Go Ahead since 2009, features social criticisms and motivational quotes. Similarly, Djarum 76 advertisements also mostly feature social criticisms, but also include a character named Om Jin (played by Totos Rasiti). Djarum Super and Gudang Garam International advertisements, however, feature action and adventures scenes instead. Sampoerna Hijau (lit.

Some cigarette advertisements have been controversial. A 2015 advertisement of A Mild featured the text  "shy at first, later wants (it)" and a still image of an almost-kissing couple, which caused inhabitants of the surrounding area to consider the advertisement as immoral.

Local ban of outdoor advertisements 
Currently, there have been a number of attempts to prohibit outdoor cigarette advertisements, including billboards, by local (mostly second-level) governments. In September 2021, the provincial government of Jakarta banned such advertisements. The regulation is effective since 13 October 2017.  Because of this ban, the organizations Kretek Preservation National Committee (KNPK), Kretek Community (Komtek), Tobacco League, including law practitioners and a group of retailers threatened to contest Anies Baswedan, the governor of Jakarta, in the local court.

Bogor city government also outlawed such advertising, effective since 27 May 2015.

See also 
 Smoking in Indonesia

References 

Mass media in Indonesia
Tobacco advertising